John Mark Colquhoun (born 14 July 1963) is a Scottish footballer who played for Stirling Albion, Celtic, Hearts, Sunderland, Millwall and St Johnstone.

Playing history
A slightly-built but very pacy striker, Colquhoun was a popular and prolific goalscorer for his hometown club Stirling Albion. He was signed by Celtic in 1983. He moved to Edinburgh club Hearts in 1985. Colquhoun helped the club achieve its best performances in many years, only losing the 1985–86 Scottish Premier Division on goal difference thanks to a last day defeat at Dundee. He earned 2 international caps for Scotland, against Saudi Arabia and Malta, in 1988.

Colquhoun played for Millwall and Sunderland in the early 1990s. He returned to Hearts in 1993. He scored the Hearts goal in the 1996 Scottish Cup Final, a 5-1 defeat by Rangers. Colquhoun spent a month with Scottish First Division side St Johnstone in 1997 and helped them win promotion. He retired at the end of the 1996–97 season, having played in over 450 league games and scored well over 100 league goals.

After playing football
Colquhoun was active in the players' union in Scotland during his playing career. After retiring from football, he was elected rector of the University of Edinburgh and served as a member of sportscotland, the sports funding body for Scotland. He is now a football agent. He was also a regular guest on STV's Scotsport.

References

External links

Hearts Profile
Scotland Record
Key Sports Management

1963 births
Celtic F.C. players
Heart of Midlothian F.C. players
Living people
Millwall F.C. players
Footballers from Stirling
Rectors of the University of Edinburgh
Scotland international footballers
Scottish Football League players
Scottish footballers
British sports agents
St Johnstone F.C. players
Stirling Albion F.C. players
Sunderland A.F.C. players
English Football League players
Association football wingers
Association football forwards